Ryo Hijirisawa (聖澤 諒, born November 3, 1985 in Chikuma, Nagano) is a Japanese professional baseball outfielder for the Tohoku Rakuten Golden Eagles in Japan's Nippon Professional Baseball.

External links

NPB.com

1985 births
Honolulu Sharks players
Japanese expatriate baseball players in the United States
Living people
Nippon Professional Baseball outfielders
Baseball people from Nagano Prefecture
Tohoku Rakuten Golden Eagles players